Annette is a 2021 musical romantic drama film directed by Leos Carax in his English-language directorial debut. The film's story and music were written by Ron Mael and Russell Mael of Sparks, with lyrics co-written by Carax. The film, which has been described as a rock opera, follows a stand-up comedian (Adam Driver) and his opera singer wife (Marion Cotillard), and how their lives are changed when they have their first child. Simon Helberg and Devyn McDowell also appear.

An international co-production between France, Germany, Switzerland, Belgium, the United States, Mexico and Japan, Annette was premiered on 6 July 2021 as the opening film at the 2021 Cannes Film Festival, where Carax received the Best Director award. It was released in France the next day by UGC Distribution and in the United States on 20 August by Amazon Studios. The film received positive reviews from critics.

Plot
After a swift courtship, provocative stand-up comedian Henry McHenry publicly declares his engagement to world-famous soprano Ann Desfranoux. Shortly afterward, Ann gives birth to their daughter Annette, portrayed by a wooden marionette puppet. The marriage becomes rocky when Henry begins to take care of Annette while Ann's career flourishes and takes her overseas.

Later, Ann has dreams about six women who come forward with allegations of past abuse at the hands of Henry and nightmares about Henry almost killing her. Back home, Henry's career begins to spiral, exacerbated by an onstage meltdown, and he comes to resent Ann's continued success. The two schedule a private cruise with the goal of mending their relationship. However, the cruise ends in disaster when Ann falls overboard during a stormy night after Henry drunkenly forces her to waltz with him. After realizing that his wife is dead, Henry gets to an island with Annette using a lifeboat. There, both fall asleep, when Ann's ghost suddenly appears and gives her voice to infant Annette as a form of revenge, so she can haunt Henry.

Though cleared of legal suspicion for Ann's death, Henry finds himself at a financial dead-end without her income. He contacts Ann's former accompanist, revealing Annette's singing voice and suggesting they use her gift for a musical act. The accompanist reluctantly agrees, having been in love with Ann, and as they tour, Baby Annette becomes a worldwide hit. Henry continues to drink heavily and stay out late, haunted by memories of Ann. One night, when returning home, Henry overhears Annette singing a rendition of “We Love Each Other So Much”, which was Ann and Henry's song. He confronts the accompanist, who implies that he is Annette's real father. In retaliation, Henry drowns him in the backyard pool, witnessed by Annette from her bedroom window. Henry plans one final performance at the "Hyperbowl" halftime show, but Annette refuses to sing, instead declaring, "Daddy kills people," to the packed stadium. Henry is tried and convicted.

A few years later, Annette visits her father in prison. Annette, suddenly portrayed by a living human girl, denies his attempts at reconciliation and even blames her mother for using her to get revenge. She tells him that he now has "nothing to love". After the living Annette leaves, the Annette puppet lies lifeless on the floor.

Cast
Adam Driver as Henry McHenry
Marion Cotillard as Ann Defrasnoux
Catherine Trottmann as Ann's singing soprano voice
Simon Helberg as The Accompanist
Devyn McDowell as Annette
Hebe Griffiths as the singing voice of Annette's puppet form.
Angèle, Kiko Mizuhara, Julia Bullock, Claron McFadden, Noémie Schellens and Natalie Mendoza as the Six Accuser Chorus 
Natalia Lafourcade as LAPD Police Officer
Kanji Furutachi as Doctor
Rila Fukushima, Eva Van Der Gucht and Laura Jansen as Nurses
Rebecca Sjöwall as Connie O'Connor
Nino Porzio as Sheriff Garoni
Davide Jakubowski as Sheriff Humprey
Wim Opbrouck as Baby Annette announcer
Colin Lainchbury-Brown as Hyperbowl announcer
Geoffrey Carey as Ape of God announcer
Yasin Islek as Dubai Singer Faruq
Russell Mael as Russell Mael/Jet pilot
Ron Mael as Ron Mael/Jet pilot
Leos Carax as Leos Carax
Nastya Carax as Nastya
Rebecca Dyson-Smith and Graciela María as Photographers

Production
It was announced in November 2016 that Carax was set to make his first English language film, with Adam Driver, Rooney Mara and Rihanna in talks to star in the film. Filming was scheduled to begin in spring 2017. In March 2017, Amazon Studios acquired the film, but Mara and Rihanna were not involved in the project. In May, Michelle Williams was cast to replace Mara, with filming then due to begin in July. Production on the film stalled, with the screenwriters Ron and Russell Mael attributing the delay to Driver's commitments to Star Wars. Filming was moved to begin in summer 2019.

Development resumed on the project in May 2019, with Marion Cotillard now cast to replace Williams. In October 2019, Simon Helberg joined the cast.

Filming began in August 2019, with shooting taking place in Los Angeles, Brussels and Bruges and at locations in Germany including Münster, Cologne and Bonn. Production concluded in November 2019. In January 2020, it was announced that the Belgian singer Angèle was cast in an undisclosed role.

Music

The first song from the score and soundtrack, "So May We Start", was released as a single on 28 May 2021.

The film's stars, while not trained, do most of their own singing. Cotillard has sung in previous film roles and has had a musical career outside film, and Driver has sung in previous film roles as well.|

A second single, "We Love Each Other So Much", was released via streaming on 25 June 2021. The soundtrack Annette (Cannes Edition - Selections from the Motion Picture Soundtrack) was released on CD and vinyl on MasterWorks / Milan label by Sony Music: it contains 15 tracks. The Unlimited Edition: The Original Movie Soundtrack was released digitally and as a double CD shortly after and contains virtually all of the music from the movie as well as demos.

Release
Annette debuted at the Cannes Film Festival on 6 July 2021. and was released in France the same day by UGC Distribution.

The film was given a limited North American theatrical release on 6 August 2021 before digital streaming on Amazon Prime Video on 20 August 2021.

In June 2021, the film's UK and Ireland distribution rights were acquired by the streaming service MUBI. It was also selected in the 'Gala Presentation' section of 26th Busan International Film Festival.

Reception 
The review aggregator website Rotten Tomatoes reports an approval rating of 71% based on 262 reviews, and an average rating of 6.7/10. The website's critics consensus reads, "A dreamy, delicate dance between farce and fantasia, Annette is a magnificently ludicrous rock opera whose experimental approach to its emotional extremes is an ambitious, if not peculiar, return for director Leos Carax." On Metacritic, the film has a weighted average score of 67 out of 100, based on 51 critics, indicating "generally favorable reviews".

Accolades

"So May We Start" was shortlisted for the Academy Award for Best Original Song, but not nominated.

References

External links
 
 Annette (Feature Film) on Crew United
 Official film treatment/"screenplay"

2020s musical drama films
2021 films
2021 drama films
Rock operas
French musical drama films
Belgian musical drama films
German musical drama films
Sung-through musical films
Films directed by Leos Carax
Films about comedians
Films about singers
Films set in Los Angeles
Films shot in Los Angeles
Films shot in Bonn
Films shot in Brussels
Films shot in Bruges
Films shot in Cologne
Films shot in Nordrhein-Westfalen
French multilingual films
Belgian multilingual films
English-language Belgian films
English-language French films
English-language German films
English-language Japanese films
English-language Mexican films
English-language Swiss films
Amazon Studios films
UGC films
Arte France Cinéma films
Puppet films
2020s French films
2020s English-language films